The 2021 Fanatec GT World Challenge Europe Powered by AWS was the eighth season of GT World Challenge Europe. The season began at Monza on 18 April and ended at Barcelona on 10 October.
The season consisted of 10 events: 5 Sprint Cup events, and 5 Endurance Cup events. The season also had 2 Official Test Days.

Calendar
The provisional calendar was released on 4 September 2020 with two unconfirmed rounds.
The calendar was updated on 23 October 2020, with the final calendar being released on 11 December 2020.
The Brands Hatch round was rescheduled from May to August.

Race Results
Bold indicates overall winner.

Championship standings
Scoring system
Championship points are awarded for the first ten positions in each race. The pole-sitter also receives one point and entries are required to complete 75% of the winning car's race distance in order to be classified and earn points. Individual drivers are required to participate for a minimum of 25 minutes in order to earn championship points in any race.

Sprint Cup points

Endurance Cup points

Paul Ricard points

24 Hours of Spa points
Points are awarded after six hours, after twelve hours and at the finish.

Drivers' championships

Overall

See also 

 2021 GT World Challenge Europe Endurance Cup
 2021 GT World Challenge Europe Sprint Cup
 2021 GT World Challenge Asia
 2021 GT World Challenge America
 2021 GT World Challenge Australia

References

External links

2021 GT World Challenge Europe
GT World Challenge Europe
GT World